Ranjal is a village in Nizamabad district in the state of Telangana in India.

References

Villages in Nizamabad district